Iambic Productions Limited is an independent television production company specializing in the fields of music, arts and drama founded by producer Chris Hunt in 1988. The company was a part of production and distribution Group DCD Media since its acquisition by the Group in 2000 until 2008, when Chris Hunt took Iambic back into private ownership

Programmes 
Productions include:

 The Truth About Boy Bands (2007)
 ABBA – Thank You For the Music (2006)
 The One and Only Michael Jackson (2006)
 Imagine: The Beatles in 'Love (2006)
 The People's Chorus (2006)
 Joan Sutherland – The Reluctant Prima Donna (2006)
 Stuart Sutcliffe – The Lost Beatle (2005) 
 Elaine Stritch At Liberty (2003 - twice Emmy award winner)
 ABBA – Perfect Hits (2005)
 Maria Callas – Living and Dying for the Art of Love'' (2004)

Awards 
Its producers have won over thirty nominations and awards in most of the major festivals in the world - BAFTA, Emmy, Prix Italia, International New York Festival, Chicago, ACE, Houston Worldfest.

People 
 Chris Hunt - Producer / Managing Director 
 Steve Cole - director and producer

External links
Iambic Productions
DCD Media

Television production companies of the United Kingdom